Robert Kirk (born 1933) is an  emeritus professor in the Department of Philosophy at the University of Nottingham.  He is known for his work on philosophical zombies—putatively unconscious beings physically and behaviourally identical to human beings.  Although Kirk did not invent this idea, he introduced the term zombie in his 1974 papers "Sentience and Behaviour" and "Zombies v. Materialists". In the latter he offered a formulation of physicalism that aimed to make clear that if zombies are possible, physicalism is false: an argument that was not much noticed until David Chalmers's development of it in The Conscious Mind. Kirk himself had reversed his position earlier, and has argued against the zombie idea in a number of books and articles on physicalism and consciousness.

As well as working on other topics in the philosophy of mind, Kirk has published on the question of how far translation and interpretation are determined by objective facts (see W. V. Quine's Word and Object (1960)). His own book on this topic, Translation Determined, appeared in 1986. Another main interest is relativism.

Selected bibliography

References

External links
Robert Kirk home page at the University of Nottingham
Zombies entry in the Stanford Encyclopedia of Philosophy
publisher's webpage about "Robots, Zombies and Us"

1933 births
Living people
Academics of the University of Nottingham
Philosophers of mind
21st-century British philosophers